The Dicrotelini are a tribe of assassin bugs in the subfamily Harpactorinae.  Originally described by Carl Stål, genera and species have been recorded from Asia and Australia.

Genera
BioLib lists the following:
 Arrilpecoris Malipatil, 1988
 Asiacoris Tomokuni & Cai, 2002 - monotypic A. pudicus (Vietnam)
 Barlireduvius Malipatil, 1988
 Dicrotelus Erichson, 1842
 Henricohahnia Breddin, 1900
 Hsiaotycoris Lu et al., 2006
 Karenocoris Miller, 1954
 Karlacoris Malipatil, 1988
 Malaiseana Miller, 1954
 Nyllius Stål, 1859
 Paranyllius Miller, 1954
 Tapirocoris Miller, 1954
 Yangicoris Cai, 1995

References

External links

Reduviidae
Hemiptera tribes